A Drop of the Hard Stuff is the debut studio album of the Irish folk group The Dubliners. It was originally released in 1967 on Major Minor Records (SMLP3 and MMLP3). When it was reissued, it was renamed Seven Drunken Nights after the first track became a hit single. The album reached number 5 in the UK album chart, and stayed in the charts for 41 weeks. The album cover provides biographical sketches of the band line-up: Ronnie Drew, Luke Kelly, Barney McKenna, Ciarán Bourke and John Sheahan.  "Limerick Rake" is sung unaccompanied. Most of the songs concern rogues and drinking. "Weila Waile" is a tragic murder ballad, sung with a certain jollity.

The album title is both an allusion to hard liquor, particularly Irish whiskey, and to the musical difficulty of the fourteen songs chosen for the album, which emphasize the considerable depths of talent of the group, from the intricate fiddle and banjo work on "The Galway Races" and the reels, to the impressive a cappella rendition of "Limerick Rake".

Track listing 
All songs are traditional compositions, with the exception of "The Travelling People," which was written by English performer Ewan MacColl.

Track 5 misspells Fermoy as "Fairmoye" on disc sleeve.

Charts

References

1967 albums
The Dubliners albums
Major Minor Records albums